Ahsan H. Mansur is a Bangladeshi economist and director of Policy Research Institute of Bangladesh. He is the chairman of BRAC Bank Limited. He is an independent director of Walton.

Early life 
Mansur completed his bachelor's in Economics from the University of Dhaka in 1974. He became a lecturer at the University of Dhaka in 1976. He completed his Masters in economics from McMaster University in 1977. He did his PhD from the University of Western Ontario in 1982.

Career 
Mansur joined the International Monetary Fund in 1981. He worked at the Fiscal Affairs Department of the International Monetary Fund from 1983 to 1989. From 1991 to 1995, Mansur served in the Policy Development and Review Department and the Middle Eastern Department of the International Monetary Fund.

Mansur was appointed a finance advisor to the Minister of Finance Wahidul Haq in 1989 and served till 1991. From 1996 to 2007, he served in the Middle East and Central Asia Department of the International Monetary Fund. From 1994 to 2007, he served as Senior Resident Representative of the International Monetary Fund in Afghanistan, Pakistan, Jordan, Kuwait, Oman, Sudan, and Yemen.

Mansur joined the Policy Research Institute of Bangladesh as executive director. Mansur was appointed chairman of BRAC Bank on 27 August 2019 replacing Sir Fazle Hasan Abed after he retired. He is a member of the Editorial Advisory Board of the Policy Insights.

Mansur had questioned the GDP figures of the government of Bangladesh which did not match with macroeconomic indicators in 2019 while predicting a slowdown of the economy. He described the need for endurance for the economy during the COVID-19 pandemic in Bangladesh. In September 2020, he said the economy was recovering. He recommended the usage of monetary policy to control inflation. He has spoken critically about S. Alam Group buying banks using loans from their existing banks. He called for reforms in the financial sector to reduce loan defaults. In 2023, he said the economic shock of Bangladesh was also the result of government inaction and not entirely based on external factors.

References 

Living people
Bangladeshi economists
University of Dhaka alumni
University of Western Ontario alumni
McMaster University alumni
Year of birth missing (living people)